Rocque Francis "Roxy" Beaudro (February 29, 1884 – February 10, 1960) was a Canadian amateur, and later professional, ice hockey winger. He was a member of the 1907 Stanley Cup champion Kenora Thistles.

Playing career
Born in Red Lake Falls, Minnesota on February 29, 1884, Beaudro moved to the Rat Portage, Ontario area in the early 1890s. At a young age he developed an interest in ice hockey and by 1896 had joined a team of other local boys, including future Hockey Hall of Famers Tommy Phillips, Si Griffis, Billy McGimsie, and Tom Hooper.

Beaudro played for the Rat Portage Thistles (later the Kenora Thistles) from 1896 to 1907, competing in five Stanley Cup series; one in 1903 and 1905 (as a spare), and three in 1907. Beaudro scored the game winning, series clinching goal in game two of Kenora's successful Stanley Cup match vs. the Montreal Wanderers in January 1907.

After several years of retirement from 1907 to 1916, Beaudro returned to play for the NHA's Toronto 228th Battalion squad in 1916–17, playing eight games with the team as a defenceman before shipping overseas to fight in World War I.

Personal
As a member of the 228th Battalion, Beaudro earned the rank of captain. Prior to entering the 228th, Beaudro was an accountant.

Beaudro returned from the war and later settled in Toronto, attending Toronto Maple Leafs games as a guest of announcer Foster Hewitt.

Beaudro was a Roman Catholic.

Death
After a short battle with cancer, Beaudro died on February 10, 1960, in Barrie, Ontario. He was 75 years old.

References

External links

1884 births
1960 deaths
Canadian ice hockey right wingers
Canadian military personnel of World War I
Canadian Roman Catholics
Ice hockey players from Minnesota
Ice hockey people from Ontario
Kenora Thistles players
People from Red Lake County, Minnesota
Sportspeople from Kenora
Stanley Cup champions
Toronto 228th Battalion players
Deaths from cancer in Ontario